The Étoile du Nord was an international express train.  It linked Paris Nord in Paris, France, with Brussels, Belgium, and, for most of its existence, also with Amsterdam CS in Amsterdam, the Netherlands.  Its name meant literally "Star of the North" (North Star), and alluded not only to its route heading north from Paris, but also to one of its original operators, the Chemin de Fer du Nord.

History

From its introduction in 1924 until 1927, the Étoile du Nord was a Rapide between Paris Nord and Brussels Midi/Zuid, and was operated by the CF du Nord and the National Railway Company of Belgium  (NMBS/SNCB).  In 1927, it became a luxury train between Paris Nord and Amsterdam CS, via Brussels, and was operated by its original operators, along with the Nederlandse Spoorwegen (NS) and the Compagnie Internationale des Wagons-Lits (CIWL).  There was one train per day in each direction.

In 1937, the CF du Nord became part of the SNCF.  Two years later, in 1939, the Étoile du Nord was suspended upon the outbreak of World War II.  In 1946, the train was revived, initially as a Rapide.  In 1957, it became a first-class-only Trans Europ Express (TEE).  In June 1984, it was downgraded to a two-class InterCity, but three years later, it was reclassified as one of the inaugural EuroCity trains.  On 2 June 1996, it was replaced by an unnamed Thalys service.

See also

 History of rail transport in Belgium
 History of rail transport in France
 History of rail transport in the Netherlands
 List of named passenger trains of Europe

References

Notes

Bibliography

External links
Benelux Railways Society: Étoile du Nord – article by Ralph Hanley about the train

EuroCity
International named passenger trains
Named passenger trains of Belgium
Named passenger trains of France
Named passenger trains of the Netherlands
Trans Europ Express
Railway services introduced in 1924
Railway services discontinued in 1996